Forbidden Hollywood can refer to:

 Forbidden Hollywood (parody), a parody show that opened Off-Off-Broadway 
 Forbidden Hollywood was a Warner Archive Collection DVD series which included inter alia the following pre-Code films:
Ex-Lady, 1933
Dark Hazard, 1934
The Mouthpiece, 1932
The Purchase Price, 1932
Three Kathryn Scola films: Baby Face, Female and Midnight Mary
Big Business Girl, 1931
 The Divorcee, 1930
Blonde Crazy, 1931
A Free Soul, 1931
Waterloo Bridge, 1931
 Forbidden Hollywood, a successor band to Frankie Goes to Hollywood